Alcestis (Ancient Greek: Ἄλκηστις) or Alceste, was a princess in Greek mythology, known for her love of her husband. Her life story was told by pseudo-Apollodorus in his Bibliotheca, and a version of her death and return from the dead was also popularized in Euripides's tragedy Alcestis.

Family 
Alcestis was the fairest among the daughters of Pelias, king of Iolcus, and either Anaxibia or Phylomache. She was sister to Acastus, Pisidice, Pelopia and Hippothoe. Alcestis was the wife of Admetus by whom she bore a son, Eumelus, a participant in the siege of Troy, and a daughter, Perimele.

Mythology 
Many suitors appeared before King Pelias and tried to woo Alcestis when she came of age to marry. It was declared by her father that she would marry the first man to yoke a lion and a boar (or a bear in some cases) to a chariot. King Admetus was able to do this because he was helped by Apollo, who had been banished from Olympus for one year to serve as a shepherd to Admetus. With Apollo's help, Admetus completed the challenge set by King Pelias, and was allowed to marry Alcestis. But in a sacrifice after the wedding, Admetus forgot to make the required offering to Artemis, therefore when he opened the marriage chamber he found his bed full of coiled snakes. Admetus interpreted it a portent of an early death.

Apollo again helped the newlywed king, this time by making the Fates drunk, extracting from them a promise that if anyone would want to die instead of Admetus, they would allow it. And when the day of his death came near, no one volunteered, not even his elderly parents, but Alcestis came forward to die in place of her husband. As a token of his appreciation for Admetus' hospitality. Heracles rescued Alcestis from the underworld, shortly after fighting with Thanatos.

Appearance in other works 

 Geoffrey Chaucer's long poem, "The Legend of Good Women" features Alcestis as a character in both versions of the Prologue. In the poem, she is consort to the God of Love and instructs the poet-narrator to tell "a glorious legend / Of Goode wymmen, maydenes and wyves / That weren trewe in lovyng al hire lyves."
Milton's famous sonnet, "Methought I Saw My Late Espoused Saint", c. 1650, alludes to the myth, with the speaker of the poem dreaming of his dead wife being brought to him "like Alcestis". 
 Lully wrote an opera, first performed in 1674, based on the story. 
 Händel wrote a 1750 masque, or semi-opera, based on this myth.
 Gluck in 1767 wrote a significant reform opera on the story. 
 Schweitzer composed an opera Alceste to a libretto by Wieland, premiered in 1773 in Weimar, as a milestone of German opera.
 In his poem "Past Ruin'd Ilion", English writer and poet Walter Savage Landor (1775–1864) wrote the line "Alcestis rises from the shades" as having a double meaning, evoking her rise from Hades while demonstrating the ability of enduring poetry to give her vitality, drawing her into the light from the shadows of historical oblivion.
 Irish poet and playwright John Todhunter wrote a play called Alcestis: A Dramatic Poem that was published in 1879. 
 Rainer Maria Rilke wrote a poem "Alkestis".
 Rutland Boughton's 1922 music-drama "Alkestis" is based on Gilbert Murray's translation of Euripides.
 H. P. Lovecraft and Sonia Greene collaborated on a play called Alcestis (however, Lovecraft scholar S. T. Joshi thinks it is entirely Greene's work). 
 Thornton Wilder wrote a play A Life in the Sun (1955) based on Euripides' play, and then the libretto for Louise Talma's opera The Alcestiad, written collaboratively and premiered by the Oper Frankfurt in German in 1962. 
 The American choreographer Martha Graham created a ballet entitled Alcestis in 1960.
 In the animated Disney film Hercules, the background story of the Megara character also alludes to Alcestis. As Hades tells it, Megara sells her soul for her lover, who does not honor the sacrifice and very soon gives his heart to some other girl.
 In The Silent Patient by Alex Michaelides, 'Alcestis' is the name of a self-portrait by artist Alicia Berenson, the eponymous silent patient who has not spoken aloud since she was arrested for her husband's murder several years before the events of the novel.

Gallery

Notes

References

Antoninus Liberalis, The Metamorphoses of Antoninus Liberalis translated by Francis Celoria (Routledge 1992). Online version at the Topos Text Project.
Cotterell, Arthur, and Rachel Storm. The Ultimate Encyclopedia of Mythology. Hermes House. .
Pseudo-Apollodorus, The Library with an English Translation by Sir James George Frazer, F.B.A., F.R.S. in 2 Volumes, Cambridge, MA, Harvard University Press; London, William Heinemann Ltd. 1921. Online version at the Perseus Digital Library. Greek text available from the same website.

External links 

 "Alcestis"—a poem by Rainer Maria Rilke

Princesses in Greek mythology
Queens in Greek mythology
Characters from Iolcus
Suicides in Greek mythology